Rugby Clube de Santarém is a rugby team based in Santarém, Portugal. As of the 2012/13 season, they play in the First Division of the Campeonato Nacional de Rugby (National Championship).

History
The club was founded in 1995 as Escola Superior Agrária de Santarém.

External links
RC Santarém

Portuguese rugby union teams
Rugby clubs established in 1995